Yanmar Stadion (formerly Mitsubishi Forkliftstadion and Almere City Stadion) is a multi-purpose stadium in Almere, Netherlands. The stadium primarily hosts association football matches and is the home ground of Almere City FC. The stadium was built in 2005 with a capacity of 3,000 spectators. In January 2020, the club completed a new grandstand, increasing the capacity to 4,501. The grandstand affords covered passages to the main club building, as well as to the new club offices which were completed in spring of 2020.

Once the stadium was used for American football.

References

Football venues in the Netherlands
Sports venues in Flevoland
Buildings and structures in Almere
Almere City FC